Abdul Rahman Auf Mosque is a mosque in Kuala Lumpur, Malaysia. This mosque is located at Jalan Puchong near Jalan Klang Lama junctions.

See also
 Islam in Malaysia

References

Mosques in Kuala Lumpur